Garganta del Villar is a municipality located in the province of Ávila, Castile and León, Spain. According to the 2006 census (INE), the municipality had a population of 56 inhabitants.

References 

Municipalities in the Province of Ávila